Hul is a Biblical figure in the Tanakh.

Hul or HUL may also refer to:

People 
 Hul Savorn, Cambodian politician
 Jon Hul, American pin-up artist

Other uses 
 Hul, Nové Zámky District, village in Slovakia
 Harvard University Library
 Hindustan Unilever, an Indian consumer goods manufacturer
 Houlton International Airport, in Maine, United States
 Hull Paragon Interchange, in Kingston upon Hull, England
 Keapara language, spoken in Papua New Guinea